The 1987 Virginia Slims of Newport was a women's tennis tournament played on outdoor grass courts at the Newport Casino in Newport, Rhode Island in the United States that was part of the 1987 Virginia Slims World Championship Series. It was the ninth edition of the tournament and was held from July 13 through July 19, 1987. First-seeded Pam Shriver won her second consecutive singles title at the event and earned $30,000 first-prize money.

Finals

Singles
 Pam Shriver defeated  Wendy White 	6–2, 6–4
 It was Shriver's 2nd singles title of the year and the 15th of her career.

Doubles
 Gigi Fernández /  Lori McNeil defeated  Anne Hobbs /  Kathy Jordan 7–6(7–5), 7–5

See also
 1987 Hall of Fame Tennis Championships – men's tournament

References

External links
 ITF tournament edition details

Virginia Slims of Newport
Virginia Slims of Newport
1987 in sports in Rhode Island
1987 in American tennis